Mincho Pashov(died 15 November 2019) was a Bulgarian weightlifter. He won the bronze medal in the 67.5 kg  in the 1980 Summer Olympics in Moscow. In 1980 and 1981 he was a world junior champion. He is three-time World Senior vice-champion - 1981, 1982, 1985, and two-time European Senior vice-champion - 1981, 1982, in 67,5 and 75 kg category. At the World Championship in 1982 in Ljubljana, Slovenia, he and Yanko Rusev improved 6 world records in 6 minutes in the category up to 75 kg. Pashov started training weightlifting in 1972 under Gancho Karushkov. He studied at the Vasil Levski Sports School and continued his education at the National Sports Academy. Mincho Pashov competed for the teams of Maritsa Plovdiv (1972 – 1981), CSKA (1981 – 1982) and Levski-Spartak (1982 – 1986). Pashov has won a total of 25 medals - 7 gold, 12 silver and 6 bronze, in total, snatch and clean and jerk from Olympic Games, World and European Championships. Despite being a very strong contender, Pashov never won a top gold medal on the international arena. He had a superb opponents’ list including phenomenal his teammate Yanko Rusev and Joachim Kunz when he pursued the win in the lightweight. And then in the middleweight he was facing, first, Yanko Rusev and then another fascinating athlete Alexander Varbanov. Pashov set 3 world records in his career – all three in the clean-and-jerk in the 75 kg class.

References 

Bulgarian male weightlifters
Olympic weightlifters of Bulgaria
Weightlifters at the 1980 Summer Olympics
Olympic bronze medalists for Bulgaria
Olympic medalists in weightlifting
1961 births
2019 deaths
Medalists at the 1980 Summer Olympics